Results for the Quarterfinals  of the 2013–14 EuroChallenge basketball tournament. The quarterfinals were played on 11, 13 and 18 March 2014. Team #1 (i.e., the group winner in each series) hosted Game 1, plus Game 3 if necessary. Team #2 hosted Game 2.

All times given below are in Central European Time.

Quarterfinals

Game 1

Game 2

Game 3

Quarterfinals
2012–13 in Turkish basketball
2012–13 in Italian basketball
2012–13 in Russian basketball
2012–13 in Hungarian basketball
2012–13 in Estonian basketball
2012–13 in Belarusian basketball